Fedjefjorden is a fjord in Vestland county, Norway. It is located in the municipalities of Fedje, Austrheim, and Øygarden.

The fjord flows between several large islands and many small islets. The island of Fedje lies on the west side of the fjord and the islands of Fosnøyna and Radøy lie along the eastern side of the fjord.

See also
 List of Norwegian fjords

References

Fjords of Vestland
Fedje
Øygarden
Austrheim